HMC Searcher is one of four cutter ships operated by UK Border Force in the role of patrolling the waters of the United Kingdom. She was launched by Damen Shipyards in the Netherlands in 2002.

History
HMC Searcher entered service in 2002 with what was then HM Customs and Excise (HMCE). HMCE merged with the Inland Revenue in 2005, and the cutter fleet became part of the newly founded HM Revenue and Customs. In 2008, the fleet transferred to the UK Border Agency, which was established to maintain the UK border. She now operates as part of the UK Border Force fleet of five cutters.

Prefix
From the merger of the Inland Revenue and HM Customs and Excise into HM Revenue and Customs on 18 April 2005, customs cutters changed their prefix from "HMRC" (His Majesty's Revenue Cutter) to "HMCC" (His Majesty's Customs Cutter). Following the transfer to the UK Border Agency this was shortened to the present "HMC" (His Majesty's Cutter) and a new livery was applied to the fleet.

Construction
HMC Searcher is the third of the Customs and Excise's fleet of  customs patrol vessels.  She was built in 2002 in the Damen Shipyards in the Netherlands, and has a steel hull with an aluminium superstructure.

Her  Rigid Inflatable Boat is launched and recovered from her stern slipway.

Propulsion

References

External links

Ships built in Vlissingen
Ships of the United Kingdom
2002 ships
Customs cutters of the United Kingdom
United Kingdom border control